Downcast is a podcast client application for iOS, macOS, and watchOS. It was originally developed by Seth McFarland of Jamawkinaw Enterprises LLC and is currently being developed and maintained by George Cox of Tundaware LLC.

References

External links 
 

Mobile applications
IOS software
Podcasting software